Hugh Lupin may refer to:

 Hugh Lupin the Elder (d. 1190/5), nobleman of the Kingdom of Sicily
 Hugh Lupin the Younger (fl. 1187–97), baron of the Kingdom of Sicily